Marne is a  command and replenishment tanker (BCR) of the French Navy. In addition to its primary duty as a fleet tanker, Marne is configured as a flagship and has served as such in the Indian Ocean.

Development and design
In French service, the final three  tankers are called Bâtiment de commandement et ravitailleur (BCR, "command and replenishment ship"). In addition to their role as a fleet tanker, the three ships dubbed BCR can accommodate an entire general staff and thus supervise naval operations as a command ship. The BCRs have one crane positioned along the centreline.

They have two dual solid/liquid underway transfer stations per side and can replenish two ships per side and one astern. These numbers change with the needs of the fleet.

The Durance-class tankers all mount a flight deck over the stern and a hangar. The ships utilise Aérospatiale Alouette III and Westland Lynx helicopters but are capable of operating larger ones from their flight deck. For defence, Marne initially mounted one Bofors /L60 anti-aircraft (AA) gun in a single gun turret and two  AA guns in a twin turret. The ship is equipped with two DRBN 34 navigational radars. The armament was later altered by removing the 20 mm guns and adding four  M2 Browning machine guns and three launchers for Simbad Mistral surface-to-air missiles. The ship has a complement of 162 and is capable of accommodating 250 personnel.

Construction and career
The fourth tanker of the Durance class was laid down on 4 August 1982 by Brest Arsenal at their yard in Brest, France. She was launched on 2 February 1985 and given the pennant number A 630. Marne was commissioned into the French Navy on 16 January 1987.  The Durance-class ships were assigned to the Force d'action navale (FAR, "Naval Action Force") after entering service. One of the BCRs is assigned to Indian Ocean as flagship of the French naval forces in the region. In addition to its mission of logistical support for other ships, Marne like its sister ships Var and Somme can accommodate additional command staff of 45 people.

As of late 2021, only Marne and her sister ship Somme remained in service. The two ships were expected to be replaced by the new Jacques Chevallier-class vessels, with Marnes retirement anticipated in 2023. On 26 February 2023 Marne was said to have conducted her last at-sea replenishment of the aircraft carrier .

Gallery

Citations

References

 
 

1985 ships
Durance-class tankers
Ships built in France